The 2020 Matchroom.Live English Open was a professional snooker tournament that took place from 12 to 18 October 2020 at the Marshall Arena in Milton Keynes, England. It was the second completed ranking event of the 2020–21 season, and the fifth edition of the English Open, first held in 2016.

The event featured 123 professionals and 5 amateurs. On the first day of the event, two players withdrew from the event due to COVID-19 – Stuart Carrington tested positive, while Sam Craigie came into contact with Carrington. Snooker referee Andrew Barklam also tested positive. On the second day, two more players had to withdraw – Peter Lines, who tested positive, and his son, Oliver Lines, who came into contact with him.

The defending champion was Mark Selby, who defeated David Gilbert 9–1 in the 2019 final. Selby lost 5–6 to Neil Robertson in the semi-finals.

In the final Robertson met Judd Trump, who beat him 9–8, after being 4–7 down. Trump won his 18th ranking title, equaling Neil Robertson and Mark Selby, and became the first player to win three Home Nations titles.

Prize fund
The event's total prize fund was a total of £405,000, with the winner receiving £70,000. The breakdown of prize money for this year is shown below:

 Winner: £70,000
 Runner-up: £30,000
 Semi-final: £20,000
 Quarter-final: £10,000
 Last 16: £7,500
 Last 32: £4,000
 Last 64: £3,000
 Highest break: £5,000
 Total: £405,000

Main draw

Top half

Section 1

Section 2

Section 3
{{#invoke:RoundN|main|columns=4
|team-width=200
|short_brackets=yes
|bold_winner=high
|RD1 = Last 128Best of 7 frames|RD2 = Last 64Best of 7 frames | RD3 = Last 32Best of 7 frames |3rdplace=no| RD4=Last 16Best of 7 frames

||  (5)|4 ||2
|| |1 ||4
||  (28)|4 ||3
|| |4 ||2
||  (12)|4 ||2
|| |1 ||4
||

Section 4

Bottom half

Section 5

Section 6

Section 7

Section 8

Finals

Final

Century breaks
A total of 66 century breaks were made by 35 players during the event.

 140, 134, 133, 129, 128, 125, 119, 117, 114, 114, 102, 100  Neil Robertson
 139  Joe Perry
 137, 112  Ding Junhui
 136, 136, 102  Stuart Bingham
 136  Hossein Vafaei
 135  Jamie Clarke
 133, 124  Gary Wilson
 133, 122, 107  John Higgins
 128  Liam Highfield
 126  Steven Hallworth
 125, 117  Mark Selby
 124, 115, 103  Zhou Yuelong
 124  Anthony McGill
 124  Eden Sharav
 122, 113  Jack Lisowski
 122  Shaun Murphy
 119, 116  David Lilley
 116  Mark Joyce
 116  Matthew Stevens
 114, 112, 102, 101  Judd Trump
 113  Luca Brecel
 113  Ronnie O'Sullivan
 111  Ben Hancorn
 110, 102  Ricky Walden
 110  Michael Holt
 110  Oliver Lines
 108  Zhao Xintong
 105, 100  Jak Jones
 105  Ryan Day
 105  Brian Ochoiski
 105  Ben Woollaston
 103, 102  Jamie Jones
 103  Robert Milkins
 102  Duane Jones
 100, 100  Kurt Maflin
 100  Farakh Ajaib
 100  Kyren Wilson

References

2020
English Open (snooker)
Home Nations Series
English Open
October 2020 sports events in the United Kingdom
Sport in Milton Keynes